The men's eight competition at the 1932 Summer Olympics in Los Angeles took place at the Long Beach Marine Stadium. It was held from 10 to 13 August. There were 8 boats (72 competitors) from 8 nations, with each nation limited to a single boat in the event. The event was won by the United States, the nation's fourth consecutive and sixth overall victory; the Americans had won every time they competed (missing 1908 and 1912). Silver went to Italy, that nation's second medal in the men's eight after a bronze in 1924. Canada repeated as bronze medalists, stretching their podium streak in the event to three Games.

Background

This was the eighth appearance of the event. Rowing had been on the programme in 1896 but was cancelled due to bad weather. The men's eight has been held every time that rowing has been contested, beginning in 1900.

Great Britain and the United States were the dominant nations in the event, with the nations winning all seven prior Olympic men's eight competitions between them. The United States held a 5–2 edge and the reigning crown, having beaten the British team in the final in 1928 to take their third straight gold. The United States was again represented by the University of California, Berkeley (the 1928 winners), while Great Britain was now represented by the Leander Club. The Leander Club had won the Grand Challenge Cup at Henley in 1929 and 1932.

Brazil, Japan, and New Zealand each made their debut in the event. Canada, Great Britain, and the United States each made their sixth appearance, tied for most among nations to that point.

Competition format

The "eight" event featured nine-person boats, with eight rowers and a coxswain. It was a sweep rowing event, with the rowers each having one oar (and thus each rowing on one side). The course used the 2000 metres distance that became the Olympic standard in 1912.

The 1932 competition had fewer boats than previous competitions and once again allowed more than two boats per race; this resulted in the event shrinking from 7 rounds in 1928 to 3 rounds. There were two main rounds (semifinals and a final), with one repechage round.

 The semifinals placed the 8 boats in 2 heats, with 4 boats per heat. The winner of each heat (2 boats total) advanced directly to the final, while the other boats (6 total) went to the repechage.
 The repechage had 6 boats. They were placed in 2 heats, with 3 boats each (before a withdrawal). The winner of each repechage heat (2 boats) rejoined the semifinal winners in the final, with the other boats (4 total, including the non-starter) eliminated.
 The final round consisted of a single final for the medals and 4th place.

Schedule

Results

Semifinals

The winners of each heat qualified to the final; the remainder went to the repechage.

Semifinal 1

Semifinal 2

Repechage

The winner from each heat qualified for the final.

Repechage heat 1

Repechage heat 2

Final

References

External links
 Official Olympic Report

Men's eight